A number of steamships have been named Smolensk, including:

, a ship of the Russian Volunteer Fleet, in service 1901–04, 1906-13 as Smolensk and with the Russian Navy as Rion 1904-06 and 1913–31
, a cargo ship in service 1916-29
, a cargo ship operated by Sovtorgflot, active until at least 1945
, a Hansa A Type cargo ship in service 1946-76